Viatcheslav Djavanian (born 5 April 1969) is a Russian former professional road cyclist. He won the Tour de Pologne 1996.

Major results

1990
 2nd Trofeo Matteotti U23
1991
 1st Duo Normand (with Andrey Teteryuk)
 2nd Mavic Trophy
 4th Road race, UCI Amateur Road World Championships
1992
 2nd Overall Settimana Ciclistica Lombarda
1994
 1st  Overall Vuelta Ciclista del Uruguay
1st Stages 2, 4, 6 & 10
 1st Stage 4 GP Lacticoop
1995
 1st Overall Four Days of Aisne
1st Stage 4
 1st Stage 4 Bayern Rundfahrt
 1st Stage 3 GP do Minho
 2nd Road race, National Road Championships
1996
 1st  Tour de Pologne
1st Stages 3 & 4
 3rd Millemetri del Corso di Mestre
 6th Trofeo Matteotti
 7th Gran Premio Città di Camaiore
 7th GP du canton d'Argovie
 8th Japan Cup
 9th Tre Valli Varesine
1997
 1st  Overall Regio-Tour
1st Stages 1 & 2
 3rd Gran Premio Città di Camaiore
 6th Overall Giro di Sardegna
 9th Veenendaal–Veenendaal
1998
 2nd Grand Prix de Villers-Cotterêts
 3rd Grand Prix d'Ouverture La Marseillaise
 5th Classique des Alpes

Grand Tour general classification results timeline

References

External links

1969 births
Living people
Russian male cyclists
Sportspeople from Gyumri